Pengorffwysfa is a village in Anglesey, in north-west Wales. It is one of several dispersed settlements in the central area of Llaneilian Community, north of Penysarn and south of Llaneilian village.

The village lies on the crossroad between Penysarn and Porth Eilian and Point Lynas Lighthouse, with turnings down towards Amlwch Port and Amlwch town, and the ascent for Llaneilian Mountain and heading towards Dulas Bay. This road forms part of the National Cycle Network Route 566, known as the Copper Trail, taking in the north coast of Anglesey that is designated an Area of Outstanding Natural Beauty, and the nearby remains of the historical copper mines at Parys Mountain.

The village has a Calvinist chapel, Capel Seilo, built in 1835 to replace a smaller chapel built in 1826. The Chapel closed in 1999 with services continuing in the adjoining Sunday school rooms built in 1896

References

Villages in Anglesey
Llaneilian